Football Club Blue Stars Zürich are a football team from Zürich, Switzerland that currently play in the 2. Liga.
They are the makers of the blue stars/FIFA youth cup.

External links

Association football clubs established in 1898
Football clubs in Switzerland
1898 establishments in Switzerland